Indian Mexicans are Mexican citizens who are descendants of migrants from India.

History

Early immigration 
The first Indians arrived in Mexico during the colonial era. During this period, thousands of Asians arrived via the Manila galleons, some of them as slaves termed chinos or indios chinos (literally "Chinese", regardless of actual ethnicity). The first record of an Asian in Mexico is from 1540; an enslaved cook originating from Calicut. The best known "china" was Catarina de San Juan, a girl captured by Portuguese slave traders in Cochin.

In 1923, immigration of ethnic Indians was secretly prohibited. The ban was kept confidential in order to avoid diplomatic problems with the British Empire. This ban, along with similar bans based on ethnicity, was eliminated by a 1947 law that prohibited racial discrimination.

Modern status 
Most of the Indians in Mexico are recent arrivals in the country and almost all of them have settled in Mexico City. Mexico has a non-discriminatory policy with regard to the grant of its citizenship. The spouse of a Mexican national would generally not face any problem in acquiring local citizenship. Although a few of the NRIs have married Mexicans, they have retained their Indian citizenship.

The Indians in this country are mainly businessmen or professionals. Many of them work with one or other international organization or a multinational corporation. There are also some academicians and scientists among them. They have helped to bring about greater mutual understanding between India and their host country. Some of the Indians work for "ISPAT Mexicana" which is part of the Laxmi Mittal group, well known in this region for having turned around a sinking steel company in Trinidad. The Indian presence in Mexico has been greatly appreciated as fifty other business ventures have invested around US$1.58 billion in the country around 1994 to 2000.

According to the Indian Ministry of External Affairs, there were about 2,000 Indians living in Mexico as of March 2011. In December 2018, the ministry estimated there are about 6,500 people of Indian descent.

Indian culture in Mexico
The main Indian community organisation is the Indian Women's Association of Mexico (IWAM) in Mexico City. It celebrates important festivals and organises cultural programmes. A Sai Baba temple, a Vaishnav temple and a Gurudwara have also been constructed by Sangam Organisation in Mexico City.

Notable individuals

 Manabendra Nath Roy – Founder of the Mexican Communist Party
 Rajagopal – Expert in business and marketing at Tec de Monterrey
 Sanjaya Rajaram – Agronomist and creator of 480 types of wheat
 Babaji Singh – Mexican Sikh credited with translating the Guru Granth Sahib into Spanish
 Pandurang Sadashiv Khankhoje – One of the founding fathers of the Ghadar Party
 David Philip – Notable chemical engineer
 Catarina de San Juan (Mirra) – Girl brought to colonial Mexico as a slave; the "China Poblana"

See also

 India–Mexico relations
 Asian Latin Americans
 Hinduism in Mexico
 Romani Mexicans

References

Asian Mexican
Ethnic groups in Mexico
Mexico
 
 
Indian Latin American
Immigration to Mexico